"The Mary Ellen Carter" is a song written and first recorded by Stan Rogers in 1979. It tells the story of a heroic effort to salvage a sunken ship, the eponymous Mary Ellen Carter, by members of her crew.

Original version
The song chronicles the efforts to salvage the ship, implying that it will be raised on the following day:

The song ends with an inspirational message to people "to whom adversity has dealt the final blow": Never give up, and, "like the Mary Ellen Carter, rise again!"

The song appears on three of Rogers' albums:

 Between the Breaks...Live!
 Home In Halifax
 The Very Best of Stan Rogers

Cover versions by notable artists 
 Jim Post began performing the song in the 1980s
 Makem and Clancy began performing the song in the 1980s, recording it on their 1986 album We've Come a Long Way
 The English a cappella trio Artisan popularised their harmony version in UK folk circles throughout the 1980s and 1990s
 Portland, Maine based folk group Schooner Fare recorded the song on their 1983 album Alive!.
 Ian Robb recorded it with the other members of Finest Kind on his album From Different Angels.
 It was recorded by the seven piece Newfoundland band The Irish Descendants as part of the tribute album Remembering Stan Rogers: An East Coast Tribute, performed by various artists at Rogers' favorite venue in Halifax, Dalhousie University
 The song was covered by Alex Beaton and featured on his Live in Concert album, released in 2012.
 The song was covered by American folk-punk band Mischief Brew on a 7-inch split released in 2013.
 The Bristolian folk group The Longest Johns released a rendition of the song in 2020.

Legacy 
As a tribute to Stan Rogers, "The Mary Ellen Carter" has been sung to close the annual Winnipeg Folk Festival every year since his death.

During the finale of the Annual Summerfolk Music and Crafts Festival held in Owen Sound, Ontario, "The Mary Ellen Carter" is sung together by many of the weekend festival's performers and the audience in tribute to Stan Rogers, who was one of the festival's original supporters and after whom the main stage was named.

Connection to the sinking of the Marine Electric 
On February 12, 1983 the ship Marine Electric was carrying a load of coal from Norfolk, Virginia to a power station in Somerset, Massachusetts.  The worst storm in forty years blew up that night, and the ship sank at about four o'clock in the morning on February 13.  The ship's chief mate, 59-year-old Robert M. "Bob" Cusick, was trapped in the deckhouse as the ship went down.  His snorkeling experience helped him avoid panic and swim to the surface, but he was left to spend the night alone on a partially deflated lifeboat he eventually reached, in water barely above freezing and air much colder. Huge seas washed over him, and each time he was not sure that he would ever reach the surface again to breathe.  Battling hypothermia, he was tempted to allow himself to fall unconscious and be washed away.  Just then he remembered the concluding stanzas of "The Mary Ellen Carter".

As Cusick tells in One Warm Line, a documentary about Rogers, he started to sing it and soon was alternately shouting out "Rise again, rise again" and holding his breath as the seas washed over him.  At seven o'clock that morning a Coast Guard helicopter spotted him and pulled him to safety.  Only three men of the thirty-four who had been aboard survived the wreck.  After his ordeal, Cusick wrote a letter to Stan Rogers telling him what had happened and crediting the song with saving his life.  In response, Rogers invited Cusick to attend what turned out to be the second-to-last concert Rogers ever performed. Cusick lived another 30 years, and his testimony and activism in the aftermath of the accident spurred far-reaching maritime safety reforms.

Published versions
 Rise Up Singing pp. 203–204

References

 "June 2, 1983: Dundas singer-songwriter Stan Rogers dies in airline disaster"
 , story of the wreck of the Marine Electric by Bob Cusick (via the Internet Archive)

External links 
 
 Nathan Rogers singing "The Mary Ellen Carter" during the 2007 Summerfolk Finale

1979 songs
Maritime music
Songs about boats
Stan Rogers songs